Uganda competed at the 2015 World Championships in Athletics in Beijing, China, from 22 to 30 August 2015.

On Day 1 (22 August), Solomon Mutai won the bronze medal in the men's marathon.

Medalists
The following Ugandan competitor won a medal at these Championships.

Results
(q – qualified, NM – no mark, SB – season best)

Men
Track and road events

Women

Track and road events

References

Nations at the 2015 World Championships in Athletics
World Championships in Athletics
Uganda at the World Championships in Athletics